is a Japanese vocalist, guitarist and singer-songwriter. She was a guitarist, vocalist and composer in the Japanese rock band GO!GO!7188 under the name; . She is also a songwriter, composer, guitarist and vocalist in the band Chirinuruwowaka. On March 1, 2004, she released the solo album Ten no Mikaku under the name .

Discography

Albums
Ten no Mikaku (March 1, 2004)

External links
Yuu's Official Site

1979 births
Living people
Japanese rock guitarists
Musicians from Kagoshima Prefecture
21st-century Japanese women singers
21st-century Japanese singers
21st-century guitarists
People from Kagoshima
21st-century women guitarists